Cynthia Barnhart (born 1959) is an American civil engineer and academic. She previously served as the Chancellor of the Massachusetts Institute of Technology, the first woman to hold that position. Barnhart's work focuses on transportation and operations research, specifically specializing in developing models, optimization methods and decision support systems for large-scale transportation problems. She also is a professor in MIT's Department of Civil and Environmental Engineering, and is an associate dean of the School of Engineering, serving a brief tenure as interim dean of engineering from 2010 to 2011.

Barnhart became a member of the National Academy of Engineering in 2010 for professional leadership and contributions to optimization and transportation models, algorithms, and applications.

On February 10, 2022, MIT announced that Barnhart will become MIT's next Provost, effective March 7.

Early life and education 
Barnhart was born in Barre, Vermont. She received her B.S. in civil engineering from the University of Vermont in 1981, going on to earn her M. S in transportation in 1985, and civil engineering Ph.D in 1988 from the Massachusetts Institute of Technology. She spent two years working at Bechtel, a firm in Washington, D.C., as a planning engineer for the city's subway system.

Academic career 
After graduation, Barnhart worked as an assistant professor at the School of Industrial and Systems Engineering at Georgia Institute of Technology before returning to MIT as an assistant professor in 1992, eventually becoming a full professor in 2002. At MIT she has served as co-director of the Center for Transportation and Logistics, co-director of the Operations Research Center, and director of Transportation@MIT.

She is the Ford Foundation Professor of Engineering at the Department of Civil and Environmental Engineering, with a join appointment at the Engineering Systems Division.

Barnhart was president of the Institute for Operations Research and the Management Sciences for the 2008 term. She was appointed as the 6th Chancellor of the Massachusetts Institute of Technology in 2014, succeeding W. Eric Grimson, a professor of Computer Science and Engineering.

On May 3, 2021, it was announced that Barnhart will step down from her role as Chancellor on July 1, 2021, at which time she will return to research and teaching activities as a faculty member.

Awards 
 2011 class of Fellows of the Institute for Operations Research and the Management Sciences
 INFORMS Award for the Advancement of Women in Operations Research and Management Science. 
 2003 Franz Edelman prize for excellence in operations research and management sciences (2nd-place).
 Presidential Young Investigator Award from the National Science Foundation
 Member of the National Academy of Engineering (2010)

References

External links 
 Office of the Chancellor homepage
 Department of Civil & Environmental Engineering page
 Engineering Systems Division page

 

Living people
American civil engineers
MIT School of Engineering faculty
MIT School of Engineering alumni
Members of the United States National Academy of Engineering
University of Vermont alumni
Georgia Tech faculty
1959 births
Fellows of the American Academy of Arts and Sciences
Fellows of the Institute for Operations Research and the Management Sciences